Bruce I. Griffey (born February 1963) is an American attorney and politician from the state of Tennessee. A Republican, Griffey has represented the 75th district of the Tennessee House of Representatives, based in Henry, Benton, and Stewart Counties, since 2019.

Career
Before running for elected office, Griffey worked as an assistant district attorney for the 24th Judicial District and an assistant attorney general for the state of Tennessee. He also owns and continues to practice at his own law firm.

In 2018, Griffey challenged State Representative Tim Wirgau in the Republican primary for the 75th district, criticizing Wirgau for voting for a fuel tax increase and in-state tuition for undocumented immigrants. Griffey defeated Wirgau in the primary with 58% of the vote, and went on to win the general election easily in the heavily-Republican district.

In 2021, Griffey introduced legislation to ban textbooks and teaching materials in Tennessee public schools that contain LGBT content.

Nepotism controversy
Griffey came under fire in 2019 after it was revealed that he had attempted to persuade Governor Bill Lee to appoint his wife, Rebecca Griffey, to an open judge position. Although Griffey had written that if his wife were to be selected, Griffey "would be forever in your [Lee's] debt," his wife was not chosen as a finalist and the position ultimately went to Huntington attorney Jennifer King. Immediately following King's appointment, Griffey began a campaign alongside local GOP officials to deny King the GOP nomination for 2020. King resigned on September 13, 2019 — nine days after her appointment — citing Griffey's actions as the reason for her departure.

Personal life
Griffey lives in Paris with his wife, Rebecca, and their two children.

References

Living people
Republican Party members of the Tennessee House of Representatives
21st-century American politicians
1963 births
University of Mississippi alumni
People from Paris, Tennessee